The 1993 Skoda Czech Open was a men's tennis tournament played on Clay in Prague, Czech Republic that was part of the International Series of the 1993 ATP Tour.
Karel Nováček and Vojtěch Flégl were the defending champions, but Nováček did not compete this year. Flégl teamed up with Cyril Suk and lost in the quarterfinals to Doug Eisenman and Donald Johnson.

Hendrik Jan Davids and Libor Pimek won the title by defeating Jorge Lozano and Jaime Oncins 6–3, 7–6 in the final.

Seeds

Draw

Draw

References

External links
 Official results archive (ATP)
 Official results archive (ITF)

Prague Open (1987–1999)
1993 ATP Tour